is a subway station on the Tokyo Metro Ginza Line in Taitō, Tokyo, Japan, operated by the Tokyo subway operator Tokyo Metro. It is numbered "G-18".

Lines

Station layout
The station has two side platforms located on the first basement (B1F) level, serving two tracks.

Platforms

History
Tawaramachi Station opened on 30 December 1927.

The station facilities were inherited by Tokyo Metro after the privatization of the Teito Rapid Transit Authority (TRTA) in 2004.

Passenger statistics
In fiscal 2011, the station was used by an average of 26,216 passengers daily.

See also
 List of railway stations in Japan

References

External links

  

Railway stations in Tokyo
Tokyo Metro Ginza Line
Stations of Tokyo Metro
Railway stations in Japan opened in 1927